Yasin, Yassin, Yassine, Yacine or Yaseen may refer to:

People
 Yasin (name), an Arabic-based name
 Yassin (name), an Arabic-based name
 Yassine (name), an Arabic-based name
 Yacine (name), an Arabic-based name
 Yaşın (name), a Turkish-based name

Places
 Yasin Valley, a valley in the Hindu Kush mountains of Pakistan
 Yasin Tehsil, an administrative unit within the valley
 Yasinia, urban-type settlement in Ukraine

Other uses
Yasin (jet), 2019 Iranian aircraft
 Yasin (rapper) also known as Yasin Byn, Swedish hip hop artist
 Yasin (RPG), a rocket-propelled grenade
 Ya-Sin, the 36th chapter in the Qur'an

See also 
 Iacin, Murcian variant of the name Joachim 
 Jasin (disambiguation)